The AWA Southern Heavyweight Championship was a major professional wrestling title in the Continental Wrestling Association during the 1970s and 1980s. The title is part of a long lineage that was started when the NWA Southern Junior Heavyweight Championship, in use since 1939, was renamed the NWA Southern Heavyweight Championship (Memphis version) in 1974. The title's name changed again in 1978, when it was renamed the AWA Southern Heavyweight Championship due to a partnership with the American Wrestling Association. It was also called the Mid-Southern Heavyweight Championship in Pro Wrestling Illustrated and its sister publications, in order for this title to not be confused with Championship Wrestling from Florida's version of the title.

The title was revived in the United States Wrestling Association from 1989 until 1997 when the USWA closed. It was known as the USWA Southern Heavyweight Championship and later simply the USWA Heavyweight Championship during that time; however, unlike the previous Southern title in Memphis, this one played a secondary role to the USWA Unified World Heavyweight Championship. It was revived in Memphis Championship Wrestling as the MCW Southern Heavyweight Championship in 2000 and 2001. It was later revived and renamed in 2004 for use in Memphis Wrestling as the Memphis Wrestling Southern Heavyweight Championship, where the last recorded champion was Brian Christopher, winning the championship on November 4, 2010, but with no recorded championship matches since then. Memphis Wrestling held their last regular in 2009.

On October 5, 2019, USA Championship Wrestling is bringing back the Southern Heavyweight Championship with a tournament happening at USA Championship Wrestling's Southern Justice taking place at Oman Arena.

Title history

United States Wrestling Association

Memphis Championship Wrestling

Memphis Wrestling

Footnotes

References

1974 establishments in Tennessee
American Wrestling Association championships
Continental Wrestling Association championships
Heavyweight wrestling championships
Memphis Championship Wrestling championships
National Wrestling Alliance championships
NWA Mid-America championships
Regional professional wrestling championships
United States Wrestling Association championships